Uherčice is a municipality and village in Znojmo District in the South Moravian Region of the Czech Republic. It has about 400 inhabitants.

Administrative parts
The village of Mešovice is an administrative part of Uherčice.

History
The first written mention of Uherčice is from 1312.

References

Villages in Znojmo District